Davide Fadani (born 3 February 2001) is an Italian ice hockey player under contract for HC Lugano of the National League (NL) and the Italian national team.

He represented Italy at the 2021 IIHF World Championship.

References

External links

2001 births
Living people
HCB Ticino Rockets players
HC Lugano players
Ice hockey people from Milan
Italian expatriate ice hockey people
Italian expatriate sportspeople in Switzerland
Italian ice hockey goaltenders